Floyd B. Burdette (September 5, 1914 – December 1, 1995) was a head coach for both the Alabama and Tennessee–Martin Skyhawks men's basketball teams. Born in Martin, Tennessee, Burdette played college basketball for one season at UT Junior College and three at Murray State University from 1935 to 1938. In all four season he competed, Burdette led his team in scoring and was an all-conference selection. He then attended Oklahoma A&M where he both coached and played in 1944 before he began his head coaching career.

Early life
Burdette was born at Martin, Tennessee on September 5, 1914. He attended UT Junior College (now known as the University of Tennessee at Martin) in 1935 where he was a member of the basketball team. Burdette led the Mississippi Valley Conference in scoring and was a selection to the all-conference squad, but transferred to Murray State University after the season. As a member of the Racers squad for the 1936, 1937 and 1938 seasons, Burdette was both their leading scorer and was selected All-SIAA in each season.

After he graduated from Murray State, Burdette went to graduate school at Oklahoma A&M (now known as Oklahoma State University) in 1939. As he pursued his master's degree in physical education, Burdette coached the Cowboys freshman team. He then played for the Oklahoma City 89ers AAU basketball team in Oklahoma City before he returned to Oklahoma A&M to head the school's air crew training program during World War II. As a result of changes to eligibility requirements for participation in intercollegiate athletics due to the war, Burdette played for Henry Iba as a center on the 1943–44 Oklahoma A&M basketball squad.

Coaching career
Burdette served as head men's basketball coach at Alabama from 1946 through 1952. During his six-season tenure with the Crimson Tide, he amassed an overall record of 81 wins and 59 losses (81–59). After he lest Alabama, Burdette returned to his hometown and coached at the University of Tennessee at Martin from 1952 to 1971. During his nineteen-year tenure with the Pacers, he amassed an overall record of 197 wins and 201 losses (197–201) and the 1970 Volunteer State Athletic Conference championship.

Head coaching record

References

1914 births
1995 deaths
Alabama Crimson Tide men's basketball coaches
Basketball coaches from Tennessee
Basketball players from Tennessee
Centers (basketball)
Murray State Racers men's basketball players
Oklahoma State Cowboys basketball coaches
Oklahoma State Cowboys basketball players
People from Martin, Tennessee
UT Martin Skyhawks men's basketball coaches
UT Martin Skyhawks men's basketball players